Michael David Gadsby (born 1 August 1947) is an English former professional footballer who played as a goalkeeper in the Football League for Notts County, York City, Grimsby Town, Bradford City and Hartlepool.

Career
Born in Oswestry, Gadsby played for Ashbourne, Notts County, York City, Grimsby Town, Bradford City, Hartlepool and Dover Town.

For Bradford City he made six appearances in the Football League.

Sources

References

1947 births
Living people
Sportspeople from Oswestry
English footballers
Association football goalkeepers
Notts County F.C. players
York City F.C. players
Grimsby Town F.C. players
Bradford City A.F.C. players
Hartlepool United F.C. players
English Football League players